Gamla Riksarkivet (Old National Archives) is a building at Arkivgatan 3 on Riddarholmen in Stockholm, Sweden. Riksarkivet, the Swedish National Archives, were located in the building until 1968.

The 19th century Brick Romanesque architecture of the building is alluding to the medieval history of Riddarholmen. The plan of the building is, however, typical for public buildings of its era, the grand style central portion clearly articulated in the façade together with the huge windows of the reading-room.  The building is connected to the Stenbock Palace where the archive was once started in 1863.  It is also similar in style to the Norstedt Building located just north of it.

See also 
 List of streets and squares in Gamla stan
 Architecture of Stockholm

References

External links 
 

Archives in Sweden
19th century in Sweden
Buildings and structures in Stockholm
20th century in Sweden
Office buildings in Sweden